Difficult is an unincorporated community in Smith County, Tennessee, in the United States.  It lies just north of State Route 85, about halfway between Defeated to the south and Kempville to the east.  Defeated Creek, a tributary of the Cumberland River, passes through the community.

History
One version of the name's origin holds that when residents applied for a post office, the application was returned because the preferred name was "too difficult".

References

External links
 

Unincorporated communities in Smith County, Tennessee
Unincorporated communities in Tennessee